Syed Mohamad Syed Akil is a Malaysian international lawn bowler.

Bowls career
Syed Akil represented Malaysia at four consecutive Commonwealth Games in 1998, 2002, 2006 and 2010. He won the gold medal in the singles event event at the 2001 Southeast Asian Games in Kuala Lumpur.

He won two bronze medals at the 2003 Asia Pacific Bowls Championships in Pine Rivers, Brisbane, Australia.

References

1963 births
Malaysian male bowls players
Living people
Southeast Asian Games medalists in lawn bowls
Competitors at the 1999 Southeast Asian Games
Competitors at the 2001 Southeast Asian Games
Southeast Asian Games gold medalists for Malaysia